A total lunar eclipse will take place on September 8, 2090.

This is the final (last) total lunar eclipse of Lunar Saros 129. The next 21 eclipses are all partial events, starting with the September 20, 2108 partial lunar eclipse.

Visibility
It will be completely visible over Americas, Europe, Africa, Asia and Australia, seen rising over the Americas on the evening of Friday, September 8, 2090 and setting over Asia and Australia on the morning of Saturday, September 9, 2090.

Related lunar eclipses

Saros series 

It last occurred on August 18, 2054 and will next occur on September 20, 2108.

This is the 42nd member of Lunar Saros 129, and the last total eclipse. The previous event was the August 2072 lunar eclipse. Lunar Saros 129 contains 11 total lunar eclipses between 1910 and 2090. Solar Saros 136 interleaves with this lunar saros with an event occurring every 9 years 5 days alternating between each saros series.

Half-Saros cycle
A lunar eclipse will be preceded and followed by solar eclipses by 9 years and 5.5 days (a half saros). This lunar eclipse is related to two total solar eclipses of Solar Saros 136.

See also 
List of lunar eclipses and List of 21st-century lunar eclipses

Notes

External links 
 

2090-09
2090-09
2090 in science